Adult Contemporary is a chart published by Billboard ranking the top-performing songs in the United States in the adult contemporary music (AC) market.  In 1975, 42 songs topped the chart, then published under the title Easy Listening, based on playlists submitted by easy listening radio stations and sales reports submitted by stores.

The first number one of the year was "Mandy" by Barry Manilow, which retained its position from the last chart of 1974, but held the top spot for only one week in 1975 before being replaced by Ringo Starr's recording of the 1950s song "Only You".  Starr thus became the second former member of The Beatles to have an Easy Listening number one since the group's break-up, following Paul McCartney's success with "My Love" in 1973.  Manilow was one of three acts to achieve three Easy Listening chart-toppers in 1975, along with Olivia Newton-John and The Carpenters.  Newton-John had the highest total number of weeks at number one of any act, spending seven weeks in the top spot.  She also recorded the longest unbroken run atop the chart, as her songs "Please Mr. Please" and "Something Better to Do" each spent three consecutive weeks at number one, the only tracks to do so during the year.  Easy Listening chart-toppers by Manilow, Netwon-John and The Carpenters also topped Billboards all-genre singles chart, the Hot 100, reflecting the fact that at the time mellower styles were popular across a range of demographics and on top 40 radio as well as the easy listening format.  Although it only topped the Easy Listening chart for a single week, Captain & Tennille's "Love Will Keep Us Together" was the biggest-selling single of 1975.

Both "Rhinestone Cowboy" by Glen Campbell and "I'm Sorry" by John Denver were triple chart-toppers, as in addition to topping both the Easy Listening chart and the Hot 100, both songs also topped the Hot Country Songs listing.  At the time, the rise of the smooth style dubbed countrypolitan meant that there was considerable crossover between the country and easy listening radio formats.  Campbell and Denver were among four acts to achieve two Easy Listening number ones in 1975, along with Captain & Tennille and Helen Reddy.  Two other singers achieved two chart-toppers in different guises.  Art Garfunkel topped the chart with his solo single "I Only Have Eyes for You" as well as with "My Little Town" with erstwhile singing partner Paul Simon.  The song was an unexpected reunion for Simon & Garfunkel, who had not recorded together since 1970.  Donny Osmond reached number one with "Morning Side of the Mountain", a duet with his sister Marie, and later returned to the top spot alongside his brothers in the group The Osmonds.  "The Proud One" would prove to be the only Easy Listening chart-topper for the Osmonds, who had experienced major pop success earlier in the 1970s but had now passed their commercial peak.  Glen Campbell's "Country Boy (You Got Your Feet in L.A.)" was the year's final number one.

Chart history

References

See also
1975 in music
List of artists who reached number one on the U.S. Adult Contemporary chart

1975
1975 record charts